Before Our Hearts Explode! is the second album by Lawrence, Kansas-based band Fourth of July. It was released August 31, 2010 on Range Life Records.

Track listing

Personnel 
 Brendan Hangauer - guitar, vocals
 Patrick Hangauer - bass
 Kelly Hangauer - trumpet, keys, vocals
 Brian Costello - drums, vocals
 Steve Swyers - guitar
 Paul Gold - mastering
 Zach Hangauer - mixing
 Colin Mahoney - recording, mixing
 Paul Gold - mastering
 Adrian Verhoeven - vocals (tracks 3, 6, 7, & 9)
 Katlyn Conroy - vocals (tracks 2, 10)
 Pre Sense Form - album design
 Sara McManus - cover

External links
Fourth of July on MySpace
Range Life Records

References

2010 albums
Fourth of July (band) albums
Range Life Records albums